The McCormick–International Harvester Company Branch House is located in Madison, Wisconsin. It was built in 1898 and added to the National Register of Historic Places in 2010.

History
The building originally served as a regional branch house for sales and distribution of agricultural implements for both the McCormick Harvest Machine Company and International Harvester. In 1902, McCormick, along with Deering Harvester Company, merged with International Harvester to become one company. Afterwards, the building's size was increased.

References 

Commercial buildings on the National Register of Historic Places in Wisconsin
Buildings and structures in Madison, Wisconsin
Commercial buildings completed in 1898
Navistar International
1898 establishments in Wisconsin
National Register of Historic Places in Madison, Wisconsin